Dilwale is an 2015 Indian Hindi-language action comedy film directed by Rohit Shetty. The film stars Kajol, Shah Rukh Khan, Kriti Sanon, and Varun Dhawan. while Vinod Khanna, Boman Irani, Kabir Bedi and Johnny Lever appear in supporting roles. The film also marked the last film appearance of Khanna, before his death on 27 April 2017.

Dilwale released theatrically worldwide on 17 December 2015, one week prior the Christmas period, to mixed to positive reviews with praise directed towards action sequences, music, humor, cinematography and cast performances, but criticism towards its story, screenplay. It became the thirteenth highest-grossing Indian film overseas and earned over  worldwide, becoming the 31st highest grossing Indian film of all time. 

At the 61st Filmfare Awards, Dilwale received 5 nominations, including Best Actor (Khan) and Best Actress (Kajol).

Plot  
Veer Bakshi and Raj Bakshi are brothers who work as car tuners in Goa. Veer meets an educated-young girl named Ishita, where he helps her, but damages the car of a customer in the process. As a penance, Raj makes Veer to fix the car in the night. Veer falls asleep while fixing the car, and when he awakes, he finds that the car's sound system is stolen.

Meanwhile, Veer gets into a tussle with a drug baron named King. He beats a few of his henchmen, who threatened Ishita, and gets knocked out. Raj breaks the fight and admits him to the hospital. Raj learns of King's hideout, where he, along with his friends Shakti and Anwar, kill the gang members and burn their stash. Raj reveals himself to be Kaali. King suspects Raj to be Kaali, due to the tussle between him and Veer. However, Raj's humbleness convinces King he is harmless, and he makes a deal to fix their car, in exchange for their protection.

2000: In Bulgaria, Raj and Veer are sons of a crime boss named Randhir Bakshi. Raj comes across Meera during one of their chases with Randhir's rival, Dev Narayan Malik. He falls in love with her, and two begin to spend time with each other. During a shipment delivery to his father, Raj gets attacked by Dev's henchmen where Meera reveals that she was Malik's daughter, and that she lied to Raj. She spares Raj's life as it was her birthday.

Raj confronts Meera shortly after this. He chases Meera in his car and saves her life when she almost falls off a cliff. He tells her to never meet him again, lest he will kill her. Meera, overcome by remorse, declares her love for Raj, who eventually forgives her. Raj and Meera reveal their relationship to Randhir and Dev who agree to meet each other. However, Dev tries to kill Raj and his father in a shootout. Dev and Randhir end up shooting each other to death. When Meera sees Raj holding a gun next to Dev's body, Meera is convinced Raj has betrayed her. She shoots him. Raj survives and Shakti and Anwar convince him to forget about the past and start a new life with Veer. 

Present: Veer discovers that his friend and Shakti’s brother, Siddhu was the thief who stole the car's parts, but spares him as Siddhu reveals that he did this for his girlfriend Jenny. Veer proposes to Ishita. Raj learns about their relationship and decide to meet Ishita's family. However, Ishita’s family is Meera, her elder sister. Upon meeting Raj, Meera immediately forbids Ishita from meeting Veer again. 

Veer and Ishita try to figure about why their siblings dislike each other so much. Veer and Siddhu try to confront Shakti and Anwar. They panic, and make up a ridiculous story, that Raj was a washerman named 'Ramlal' and Meera was a girl named 'Pogo' who left him for money. Veer and Ishita scheme together to rekindle Raj and Meera's relationship, but they are unsuccessful. Mani, Raj's lieutenant, steal's one of King's cars and brings it to the shop. Veer, Mani and Siddhu discover drugs in the car's decklid and burn them. 

Upon realizing Ishita loves Veer greatly, Meera issues an ultimatum that, in order to marry Ishita, Veer must move in with Meera, leaving Raj in the process. As an angered Veer proceeds to storm out, Meera reveals to Veer that Raj was actually Randhir's adopted son and is not Veer's biological brother. Raj confirms this and the two brothers embrace. Angry, Raj confronts Meera for trying to ruin his relationship with his brother. He tells her is innocent, and never betrayed her. Malik's right hand, Raghav reveals Raj's innocence, and Meera, who realizes the truth, takes Ishita to Raj's house, declaring that Veer can live with Raj and Ishita after marriage. Meera apologizes to Raj, and he forgives her immediately.

At Siddhu and his girlfriend Jenny's wedding in a church, King finds his car (which was being used as a wedding car) and brings Mani, Oscar and Veer, demanding to know where his drugs were. He loses his temper when he learns what happened, and a fight ensues where Raj reveals himself as Kaali and thrashes King. King tries to kill Raj, but Meera takes the bullet, and King is beaten up and thus defeated by Raj's men. Meera is admitted to the hospital, where she recovers and reunites with Raj.

Cast 
 Shah Rukh Khan as Raj "Kaali" Bakshi
 Kajol as Meera Malik
 Varun Dhawan as Veer Bakshi
 Kriti Sanon as Ishita "Ishu" Malik
 Vinod Khanna as Randhir Bakshi (Kaali and Veer's father)
 Kabir Bedi as Dev Narayan Malik (Meera and Ishita's father)
 Varun Sharma as Siddharth "Sidhu" Saigal
 Johnny Lever as Mani Tripathi
 Boman Irani as King Bhattacharya
 Mukesh Tiwari as Shakti Saigal
 Pankaj Tripathi as Anwar Ali Mirza
 Chetna Pande as Jenny D'Costa
 Sanjay Mishra as Oscar D'Costa
 Nawab Shah as Raghav Shankar
 Yogesh Lakhani as Customer At The Cafe
 Pradeep Kabra as Joshua

Production

Development 
In January 2015, Rohit Shetty announced a project with Shah Rukh Khan in the lead which would be their second collaboration after the 2013 film Chennai Express. Shetty stated that he would start filming in March 2015. Shetty paired actress Kajol with Khan, making it the seventh time they were cast opposite each other. He also signed actor Varun Dhawan who was reportedly playing Khan's brother, while actress Kriti Sanon was signed opposite him and Kajol's sister.

Filming 
Principal photography began on 20 March 2015 with Dhawan in Goa. Khan and Kajol first joined the crew for filming in Bulgaria from June 2015. Later that month, the first song from the film was shot on Dhawan and Kriti Sanon, in Bulgaria. The schedule there was wrapped up by late July. In August 2015, a romantic song featuring the lead pair was shot in Iceland. The entire team then left for Hyderabad in early September to shoot what was touted to be the final schedule of filming. However, the work in Hyderabad was completed by late October, and filming officially came to an end with a brief schedule in Goa, the same location where it was started. In December, after the promotions had commenced, another song was shot in haste. It featured all four lead actors and had to be played simultaneously with the end-credits.

Release

Theatrical
Dilwale was released in the United Arab Emirates a day before its worldwide release on 18 December 2015. The film was released in around 3100 screens in India.

On 14 December 2015, in the United Kingdom, the film received a 12A classification from the British Board of Film Classification for "moderate violence". The film's UK distributor chose to remove thirteen seconds to obtain this rating (the excised material being scenes involving stronger violence than possible for a 12A rating). An uncut 15-rated version is available.

Home media
The satellite rights of the film were sold to Sony Pictures Networks as part of a deal worth .

Reception

Box office
Dilwale made around  worldwide in its opening weekend, the third highest of the year.

India
The film, releasing alongside Bajirao Mastani, opened number one at the box office, and collected  nett in India on its opening day, the third highest of the year after Prem Ratan Dhan Payo and Bajrangi Bhaijaan. The film showed little drop on its second day, and earned nearly  nett. On its first Sunday, Dilwale took in approximately  nett, bringing the three-day nett to an estimated . Dilwale had a first week of  nett in the domestic market.

The film earned around  nett in its second weekend. It grossed little over  nett in week two, taking its business to  nett. The film made around  nett more in the third week.

Khan expressed disappointment with the film's domestic performance in India. Kajol was also reportedly disappointed, with reports claiming that she regretted turning down the lead role in a Sujoy Ghosh film in favour of Dilwale.

Other territories 
Dilwale had the highest opening of 2015 abroad and the second highest ever, with a weekend gross of around 8.5 million. The film also set an all-time record opening in the Persian Gulf region. In Pakistan, the film earned  in its first three days. The film collected 9.13 crore in Pakistan in the first week. The film went on to earn over $13 million overseas in the first week, again the highest of the year.

Dilwale grossed another $3.75 million in the second weekend, for an overall $16.75 million in ten days. After two weeks, the film's earnings abroad were more than $20.5 million. The film had grossed around $23.3 million outside India as of 12 January 2016 to become the highest-grossing film starring Shah Rukh Khan in overseas markets.

Dilwale sales reached more than $25 million following openings in new markets such as Germany, Netherlands and Indonesia. The film went on to earn approximately $26.6 million (INR 1756.5 million) by February 2016. The film's final overseas gross was US$30.2 million (194crore), the highest ever for a Shah Rukh Khan film, and making it the twelfth highest-grossing Indian film overseas.

Critical response
The film received mixed-to-positive reviews from both the critics and audience, alike. Taran Adarsh from Bollywood Hungama gave the film 4/5 stars, saying, "On the whole, Dilwale is akin to a mouthwatering meal that satiates the craving of those who relish masalathons, besides being an absolute treat for SRK-Kajol fans. An unadulterated crowd-pleaser, Dilwale delivers what you expect from a Rohit Shetty film: King-sized entertainment. Go for it!". Komal Nahta in his review of the film said, "Dilwale is a masala entertainer from the start till the end." Rachit Gupta from Filmfare gave it 4/5 stars and added, "Dilwale is the quintessential popcorn flick. It's colorful, bright and entertaining. It smartly keeps its play on the SRK-Kajol chemistry (watch out for the brilliant ending). It has fantastic music. Decent laughs too. Definitely worth a dekho." Sarita A Tanwar of DNA gave the film 3/5 stars, saying "Dilwale is flawed, but it's right for those who believe that love does conquer it all, actually."

Ananya Bhattacharya of India Today also rated the film 3/5 and concluded, "Dilwale is immensely enjoyable despite an oh-my-god-this-is-so-predictable story. Keep your brains out of the picture, and you have an out-and-out entertainer which fits perfectly in the mould of a guilty pleasure. Go indulge!" Shubha Shetty-Saha of Mid-Day gave the film 3 stars as well and said, "Watch this for the chemistry between SRK and Kajol which refuses to simmer down even after all these years." Meena Iyer from The Times of India gave the film 3/5 stars, criticizing the plot, and stated, "Dilwale leans heavily on Shah Rukh's mega-stardom, Varun's effervescence, breathtaking locales (Iceland and Bulgaria), orchestrated car chases and over-the-top situations, which have you chuckling."

NDTV felt that the film's plot "went in circles" and that while Kajol was great, the film overall failed to appeal. The Economic Times gave the film 2.5/5 stars and felt that it "lacked soul and freshness" and stated that it would only appeal to fans of Khan and Kajol. Rajeev Masand of IBN Live gave the film 2 out of 5 and said, "The real problem with Dilwale is the sheer artificiality of the enterprise. From the rainbow-hued sets and the touched-up landscapes in the Gerua song, to many moments of comedic and emotional payoff, so much of it just feels fake." Namrata Joshi of The Hindu commented, "With Dilwale, Rohit Shetty goes hopelessly wrong despite much that he had at his disposal, including a power-packed cast and producer". Joshi also felt that the attempt to repackage Khan and Kajol had backfired. Rohit Vats of Hindustan Times gave the film a 1.5/5 rating and called the plot "highly predictable". Anupama Chopra of Hindustan Times gave the film 2 out of 5 stars and said, "Even in the context of Shetty's oeuvre, Dilwale is a low. It made me nostalgic for Chennai Express...Rohit and leading man Shah Rukh Khan have clearly positioned Dilwale as a masala entertainer. Which means that we must not expect logic, coherence, characters or depth." Raja Sen of Rediff gave the film 1 out of 5 stars and said, "Budget and access. These have long been Shetty's favoured Lego blocks, and they have never been more visible than in Dilwale, where the greatest on screen pair in modern Hindi cinema are reduced to insignificance."

Accolades

Soundtrack

The songs featured in the film as are composed by Pritam, and lyrics are written by Amitabh Bhattacharya.
Amar Mohile has composed the film score.

A track titled "Gerua" was released on 18 November 2015 as the first single prior to the soundtrack album's release. The second single to be released was "Manma Emotion Jaage" which was released on 26 November 2015.  The album features seven tracks and was released on 4 December 2015 by Sony Music India. Sony Music India acquired the music rights of the film for a record .

The song "Gerua" also had different versions. An Arabic version called "Telagena" was released on 11 December 2015 while a Malay version entitled "Warna Cinta" featuring vocals from Aliff Aziz and Kilafairy was released later on 18 December 2015.

References

External links 
 
 
 

2015 films
2010s Hindi-language films
2015 action comedy films
2015 romantic comedy films
Indian romantic action films
Indian action comedy films
Indian romantic comedy films
Films featuring songs by Pritam
Films directed by Rohit Shetty
Films shot in Bulgaria
Films shot in Goa
Films shot in Hyderabad, India
Films shot in Iceland
UTV Motion Pictures films
Red Chillies Entertainment films
2010s romantic action films